Aquarii is a name given to the Christians who substituted water for wine in the Eucharist. In Greek they were called Hydroparastatae, or those who offer water. Theodosius I, in his edict of 382, classes them as a special sect with the Manicheans, who also eschewed wine.  Catholics consider the substitution an act of heresy.

Etymology 
Aquarii is considered a misspelling associated with Aquarians, as it has another meaning — "Slaves who carried water for bathing into the women's apartments". Other terms used in reference to the Aquarians include the Encratites ("the Abstinent") and Ebionites.

See also 
 Christian views on alcohol

References

External links 
 Triumph of the Church from Catholic Truth Publications
 False Religious Denominations Throughout History from Traditional Catholic Apologetics
 Material of the Host
 The Church, The Mystical Body from Slaves of the Immaculate Heart of Mary
 History of the Christian Church: Heresies of the Ante-Nicene Age from the Interactive Bible
 Aquarians - Catholic Encyclopedia article

Heresy in ancient Christianity
Former Christian denominations